Stephen Carey (born 14 October 1959) is a former Australian rules footballer who played with Essendon and Geelong in the Victorian Football League (VFL).

Essendon recruited Carey from North Launceston and by 1981 he had found a regular place in the Bomber's defence. He played in their 1983 Grand Final loss to Hawthorn but was part of their side two years later when they turned the table on Hawthorn and won the 1985 premiership. Carey was traded to Geelong just after the beginning of the 1986 season in what would be his final year in the VFL.

Carey coached Warragul Football Club in the West Gippsland Latrobe Football League in 2009.

External links

1959 births
Living people
Essendon Football Club players
Essendon Football Club Premiership players
Geelong Football Club players
North Launceston Football Club players
Tasmanian State of Origin players
Australian rules footballers from Tasmania
Tasmanian Football Hall of Fame inductees
One-time VFL/AFL Premiership players